Nickardo Blake (born November 26, 1989) is a Jamaican-American retired footballer.

Career
Born in Clarendon, Jamaica, Blake was selected by Toronto FC as the 14th pick of the 2012 MLS Supplemental Draft. He joined the club during preseason camp, but was let go shortly after. Blake returned to Florida where he was invited to spend preseason with his local club, the Fort Lauderdale Strikers. On March 28, 2012 the Strikers announced that Blake had signed professional terms with the club.

Blake made his professional debut with the Strikers against FC Edmonton on April 7, 2012 in the first game of the 2012 NASL season. He played the entire 90 minutes at right back in the 1-0 victory.

References

External links
Fort Lauderdale Strikers bio

1989 births
Living people
Jamaican footballers
Jamaican expatriate footballers
UConn Huskies men's soccer players
Fort Lauderdale Strikers players
Expatriate soccer players in the United States
North American Soccer League players
Toronto FC draft picks
Soccer players from Florida
Association football defenders
Boca Raton FC players
Jamaican expatriate sportspeople in the United States
People from Clarendon Parish, Jamaica